The 1931 VFL Grand Final was an Australian rules football game contested between the Geelong Football Club and Richmond Football Club, held at the Melbourne Cricket Ground in Melbourne on 10 October 1931. It was the 33rd annual Grand Final of the Victorian Football League, staged to determine the premiers for the 1931 VFL season. The match, attended by 60,712 spectators, was won by Geelong by a margin of 20 points, making it the club's second VFL premiership victory. The triumph has become legendary because it was the first, and only, season that Geelong was coached by Charlie Clymo.

Background
The teams had finished the home and away season with 15 wins each, with Geelong claiming the minor premiership and two victories over Richmond during the season. Richmond turned the tables and defeated Geelong by 33 points in the semi-final held two weeks prior, with Geelong recovering the following week to defeat  by six points in the preliminary final, despite trailling by 47 points at quarter time.

Match summary

After winning the toss and electing to kick to the Punt Road End, Les Hardiman kicked the first goal for Geelong within the first two minutes of the match. In a hard and contested contest, scoring was limited in the first half, with neither team able to utilise the advantage of the strong breeze blowing towards the Punt Road goal, with Geelong kicking late goals into the wind to lead at half time by seven points. Geelong kicked away in the third quarter to set up the victory, taking advantage of the conditions to lead by 24 points going into the final quarter. Alan Geddes playing on the wing for Richmond was noted as his team's best player, with Jack Carney a matchwinner for Geelong, handily beating his opponent Stan Judkins.

Scoreboard

Teams

 Umpire - Bob Scott

References

AFL Tables: 1931 Grand Final
 The Official statistical history of the AFL 2004 
 Ross, J. (ed), 100 Years of Australian Football 1897-1996: The Complete Story of the AFL, All the Big Stories, All the Great Pictures, All the Champions, Every AFL Season Reported, Viking, (Ringwood), 1996.

See also
 1931 VFL season

VFL/AFL Grand Finals
Grand
Geelong Football Club
Richmond Football Club
October 1931 sports events